Scaevola globosa is a species of flowering plant in the family Goodeniaceae. It is a small, spreading shrub with fan-shaped yellow flowers and elliptic to egg-shaped leaves.

Description

Taxonomy and naming
This scaevola was first formally described by Roger Charles Carolin in 1974 as Nigromnia globosa. In 1990 Carolin changed the name  to Scaevola globosa. The specific epithet (globosa) refers to the inflorescence.

Distribution and habitat
Scaevola globosa grows in sandy soils near Carnamah, Yuna and Mingenew.

References

 

globosa
Flora of Western Australia